The "Five Red Categories" during the Chinese Cultural Revolution (1966–1976) were the social classes favoured by the Chinese Communist Party (CCP), as opposed to the Five Black Categories that were classified as potential threats or enemies. In the beginning of the Cultural Revolution, Red Guards were only allowed to come from the "Five Red Categories". These included:
Poor and lower-middle peasants
Workers
Revolutionary soldiers within the People's Liberation Army
Revolutionary cadres who are active members of the CCP in good standing
Revolutionary martyrs, including immediate family members, children, grandchildren (if any) and relatives of deceased CCP members and PLA service personnel killed in action

See also 

 Five Black Categories
 Stinking Old Ninth

References

Further reading 

Cultural Revolution
Ideology of the Chinese Communist Party